= Thyamis (mythology) =

In Greek mythology, Thyamis (Ancient Greek: Θύαμις) was a commander, along with his brothers, the Cyraioi, who fought together with Deriades against Dionysus in the Indian War. He was son of Tarbelus and is mentioned in Nonnus Dionysiaka. Another individual named Thyamis was a warrior in the army of Dionysus during the Indian War. He was killed by King Deriades of India.
